Graham Gristwood (born 1984) is a British orienteering competitor and world champion.

Graham is a member of the Great Britain Orienteering Squad and also runs for IFK Lidingö SOK. In 2004 Graham first made the senior World Champs team. His first notable successes came in 2006 where he won both the Sprint and the Overall title at the Jan Kjellstrom orienteering festival. He has since won another title in both the Sprint and the Overall.

He received a gold medal in the relay event at the 2008 World Orienteering Championships in Olomouc, together with Jon Duncan and Jamie Stevenson.

Graham started orienteering before he could even walk, when his father would carry him! Graham attended the Royal Grammar School, Guildford. Graham did a masters at Sheffield Hallam University and ran for Sheffield University Orienteering Club. In 2010 he was part of the winning JK and Harvester relay teams. Currently he runs for Forth Valley.

Gristwood became only the second man after Chris Hirst to win the British Orienteering Championships four times in a row, between 2014 and 2017. He has also won the British Sprints twice, the British Middle once and the Night Championships a record seven times in a row.

See also
 British orienteers
 List of orienteers
 List of orienteering events

References

External links
 
 
 

1984 births
Living people
British orienteers
Male orienteers
Foot orienteers
World Orienteering Championships medalists
People educated at Royal Grammar School, Guildford
21st-century British people